{{Infobox film
| name           = Jhalki
| image          = Jhalki_Movie_Official_Poster.jpg
| caption        = Jhalki official poster
| director       = Brahmanand S Siingh
| screenplay     = Kamlesh Kunti SinghBrahmanand S SiinghTanvi Jain
| story          = Prakash JhaBrahmanand S Siingh
| producer       = Annand ChavanBrahmanand S Siingh
| starring       = Boman IraniTannishtha ChatterjeeDivya DuttaSanjay SuriAkhilendra MishraJoy SenguptaGovind NamdevBachan PachehraAarti JhaGoraksha Sakpal
| cinematography = Rupesh Kumar
| editing        = Suresh Pai
| music          = Sandesh Shandilya
| studio         = Mobius Films
| distributor    = Panorama Studios
| released       = {{Film date|2019|11|14|df=y|ref1=<ref name=release>{{cite news|url=https://www.outlookindia.com/newsscroll/amp/jhalki-to-release-on-childrens-day/1627676|newspaper=Outlook|title=Jhalki to release on Childrens Day|date=26 September 2019|access-date=3 October 2019}}</ref>}}
| country        = India
| language       = Hindi
}}Jhalki is a 2019 Indian Hindi-language drama film directed by Brahmanand S. Siingh, produced by Brahmanand S. Siingh (Mobius Films) and Annand Chavan (OMG), co-produced by Vinayak Gawande and Jayesh Parekh and co-directed by Tanvi Jain. The film featuring Boman Irani, Tannishtha Chatterjee, Divya Dutta and Sanjay Suri, follows a 9-year-old street girl Jhalki, setting out to find her 7-year-old brother against the backdrop of the child slavery trade. The trailer of the film was released at the Cannes Film Festival in May 2019.

The film has been premiered at various national and international film festivals and won 16 awards so far. It was released theatrically in India on 14 November 2019.

SynopsisA life-altering disappearance of her 7-year old brother sets Jhalki off on a mission to find him at all costs. Armed with an intimate folk-tale and her own sharp mind, is Jhalki's journey the start of a spiral that will change the lives of thousands for good? What price must she pay to get what she wants? Inspired by true events, with a backdrop of human-trafficking and child-labour, Jhalki becomes an atypical thriller of hope, courage, self-belief and perseverance, seen through the eyes of a 9-year-old girl, who will not stop anywhere short of a triumph.''

Cast 
 Boman Irani as Kailash Satyarthi
 Tannishtha Chatterjee as Priti Vyas
 Divya Dutta as Sunita Bhartiya
 Sanjay Suri as DM Sanjay Bhartiya
Joy Sengupta as SDM Akhilesh
 Bachan Pachehra as Rahim Chacha
 Akhilendra Mishra as Shivlal Chakiya
 Govind Namdev as RamPrasad
Yatin Karyekar as Sipahi
 Vikram Singh as Lakhna
 Sanchita Goswami as Phullorani
Aarti Jha as Jhalki
 Goraksha Sakpal as Babu
 Sailessh Dubey as Mohan
 Kailash Satyarthi (Special Appearance) as himself
Mahesh Chandra Deva as shivlal chakiya men's-1

Location 
The film was shot in and around Mirzapur (Uttar Pradesh) and in Film City (Mumbai).

Release and Promotion.
Jhalki was released nationwide (theatrically) by Panorama Studios on 14 November 2019 (Children's Day). The team collaborated with The Kapil Sharma Show, ABP News, Kidzania too for the promotions.

Campaigns and Reach 
After watching the film, some big stakeholders have come on board as partners, who have felt the need to promote the film for maximum number of viewers to increase awareness and inspire people with the courage & life skills of Jhalki.

The film is also proposed as one of the first films to establish a new genre of films - Cinema for Change. Kailash Satyarthi Children's Foundation is promoting the film through Mukti Caravan and Picture Time wherein the film is screened for  children, village communities, policy makers, chief ministers, judiciary, bureaucrats, MPs and MLAs, law enforcement agencies and national and state commissions for protection of child rights. Apart from KSCF, 9 other NGO partners are on board (Cry, Light of Life Trust, Udaan, Save The Children, Angel Xpress, Aangan, Salaam Baalak Trust, Prayas and Akshara Foundation) who are promoting and screening the film for their respective work areas and donor base by running special campaigns. Conversations with the Education Ministry and Women & Child Development Ministry are in progress for having screenings across all government aided schools. Effective international associations, advocacy groups, Non-profit organizations globally and Social Impact Media Partners are in conversations to collaborate. UNICEF, along with Massachusetts Coalition to End Human Trafficking, New England International Donors and Tufts Institute for Global Leadership have already started the process.

A unique collaboration with Picture Time to reach the film in various ways (ticketed & sponsored) has already begun. These are van-mounted mobile theatres which takes 2.5 hours to be made fully functional, complete with air-conditioning, seating arrangements and world class high-definition digital projection and 5.1 Dolby surround sound for a high quality Cinema experience to every corner of the country, especially rural areas.

Box-Office collection 
The film earned 1.96 crores INR (approx.) at the box-office in its first week of release.

Reviews 

 Brahmanand deals with a subject that is sensitive and socially alarming. --Times Of India  
 A cinematic tribute to Nobel laureate Kailash Satyarthi. --The Hindu
 Jhalki's earnestness and ability to spark a debate, is great humanitarianism on screen. --GlamSham
 It is not every day that you find a Hindi film that is backed by a Nobel laureate. –Cinestaan
 Trust National Award-winning filmmaker Brahmanand S Siingh to leave no stone unturned when backing a project that has the potential to impact lives. --Entertainment Times (Times of India)
 Jhalki is Brahmanand's humanitarian plea for hope, childhood & calls for innocence --CineBlues
 ...winning hearts of the audience --BollywoodTown
 The film is so human and it's so simple. I didn't even realize when and how often I cried in the film. --Bhawana Somaaya, Film Critic 
 Film bohot samvedansheel tareeke se iss mudde ko chhooti hai. Film bohot badha koi dawa nahi karti hai na aisi koi promise karti hai, bohothi chhoti kahani hai aur chhote tareeke se apna... bohot hi  halke fulke andaaz mein apni baat keh jaati hai. --Ajay Brahmatmaj, Film Critic 
 'For anyone of us who has ever cared for the future of our children Jhalki is a heartwarming at times heart-stopping saga about the loss of innocence and a flash of hope.’ ! --Subhash K Jha, Film Critic
 "JHALKI" - Raw. Real. Relevant. ‘Jhalki’ is a refreshing take on brother-sister bonding. The ensemble cast gets into the skin of their characters while Aarti's performance will make you go ‘awww’ while Goraksh is earnest to the core. Brahmanand's writing will tug your heartstrings while his direction is sensitive. Don't miss this innocent, sweet, but small yet big (in concept) film! --Bhavikk Sangghvi, Film Critic 
 What a beautiful film ... it's very rare that you get to watch such mindful content. --Anurag Pandey, RJ
Director Brahmanand Singh takes this story through realistic lane and that was needed. -- Cinespeaks
 It's not just a visual experience but also a life transforming experience. --Neelam Kumar, Best Selling Author 
 I wish it could be shown to many more children perhaps to every school and make it compulsory for every school kid to see it. Perhaps to every organization, women's organization all the Rotary Clubs, all the Lions Club ... --Dolly Thakore, Thespian
 Jhalki, in her own way, is a super hero without a cape ... --Deepa Gahlot, Film Critic, Author, Journalist
 Jhalki is a humanitarian plea for hope, childhood & call for innocence --Vishal Verma
 A heartwarmingly emotional as well as a feel good film, which you should not give a miss. --Bolly.com
Rarely do we see meaningful films with serious backdrop which are so entertaining, engaging and inspiring. -- Business Standard
Kailash Satyarthi's life-time of work of his crusade against human trafficking and child labour gets crystallized into one smooth story of conviction, courage and love. And what gets questioned in the process, is the inhuman practice of the people reaping benefit from the racket. -- ANI

Awards and Selections

References

External links 
 Jhalki on IMDb
 Official Website

2019 films
2010s Hindi-language films
Films about children
Films about social issues in India
Child labour in India